Measuring the World is a 2012 German / Austrian 3D film based on the eponymous novel by Daniel Kehlmann.

Cast 
 Florian David Fitz as Carl Friedrich Gauß
 Albrecht Schuch as Alexander von Humboldt
 Jérémy Kapone as Aimé Bonpland
 Vicky Krieps as Johanna Gauß
 Katharina Thalbach as Dorothea Gauß (mother)
  as Gerhard Dietrich Gauß (father)
 David Kross as Eugen Gauß (son)
 Sunnyi Melles as Marie Elizabeth von Humboldt (mother)
 Karl Markovics as Lehrer Büttner

References

External links 

2010s biographical films
2010s adventure films
Austrian biographical films
Austrian adventure films
German biographical films
German adventure films
Films directed by Detlev Buck
Films based on German novels
German 3D films
Films set in the 18th century
Films set in the 19th century
Films set in South America
Age of Discovery films
Biographical films about mathematicians
Biographical films about scientists
2010s German films